Babcock Ranch is a planned community located in southeastern Charlotte County and northeastern Lee County, Florida consisting of approximately . The planned community was approved as part of a public-private partnership with the State of Florida and local governments. The deal established the neighboring Babcock Ranch Preserve.

Plans for the future town of Babcock Ranch were announced in 2005 by real estate development firm Kitson & Partners as part of a complex real estate transaction that facilitated the largest conservation land acquisition in Florida history. In 2009, the company joined with Florida Power & Light to announce plans to make Babcock Ranch the first solar-powered city in the United States. A large photovoltaic power station and a network of rooftop solar panels on commercial buildings, planned to be expanded over time, are intended to send more renewable power into the Florida electrical grid than the city consumes.

Early history
Occupying land in both Charlotte and Lee counties near Fort Myers, Babcock Ranch was named after Edward Vose Babcock, a lumber baron and mayor of Pittsburgh (1918–1922), who purchased the land in 1914. The land's primary use was logging and agriculture, and those uses continue to generate funds for maintenance and operation of the Babcock Ranch Preserve. The Babcock Ranch Preserve Act enacted by the Florida legislature in 2006 made it the first Florida preserve responsible for generating its own funding under a public private management partnership that includes the Florida Fish and Wildlife Conservation Commission and the Florida Forest Service.

State ownership
In the late 1990s, the Babcock family sought to sell the ranch to the state of Florida. The property was considered a priority for purchase by conservation leaders who saw it as the final section needed to establish an environmental corridor stretching from Lake Okeechobee in the center of Florida all of the way to the Charlotte Harbor Estuary on Florida's Gulf Coast.

A sale of the real estate would have triggered significant tax liabilities that could be avoided if ownership was transferred through sale of all corporate stock. The state was barred from meeting the family's terms by a provision in the state constitution prohibiting use of land acquisition funds for purchase of a private company's stock.

The contract was contingent on a series of local and state approvals for development on the property to be retained by Kitson & Partners and a land management agreement that would provide for continued ranching operations and employment of the ranch staff under state ownership. Purchase from the family and sale of the preserve lands to the State of Florida and Lee County closed on July 31, 2006.

As part of the arrangement, Kitson & Partners received $350 million for the land, with approximately $310 million provided in the final budget of Governor Jeb Bush and $40 million from Lee County, Florida. According to Time, the purchase was the "largest preservation buy in Florida history". Governor Bush stated that the state ownership "would preserve the single largest tract of contiguous land in the state's history".

Development
The center of the planned urban development is about ten miles south southwest of the former Babcock family home and barns. Plans for the proposed city of Babcock Ranch were developed with public participation through a series of meetings held in Charlotte County in early 2006 and formally announced with the first application for development approvals. Designed as a magnet for high tech companies and research and development hub for clean energy methods, Babcock Ranch is planned to be self-contained with four villages and five hamlets. The plan is for a total of 20,000 permanent jobs would be added to sustain up to 50,000 residents in 19,000 households. Babcock Ranch is expected to include  of light industry, retail, commerce, offices and civic space. The downtown area will be walkable and bikeable, and will include 8,000 homes as well as offices, business parks, hospital care center, shopping, restaurants, entertainment and lodges. Construction started in November 2015 and the beginning of construction was celebrated on Earth Day 2016.

Babcock Ranch will have eight magnet schools administered by Charlotte County Public Schools. The elementary schools will be near the center of each village, and the high school will be accessible by bike trails. In addition, Florida Gulf Coast University plans to build a satellite campus in Babcock Ranch. All commercial buildings and homes in Babcock Ranch must be certified as energy-efficient and constructed according to Florida Green Building Coalition standards. Some homes will be constructed using insulated panel design.

Infrastructure 
Plans are for Babcock Ranch to have an interconnected system of computer networks utilizing the IBM Rational Focal Point software running all city services from transport to energy to communications, and also linking up to local businesses;  Babcock Ranch will be added to IBM's list of the world's "smarter cities". According to Smart Planet, wireless Internet connectivity will cover the whole of Babcock Ranch city.

An on-site 75-megawatt solar photovoltaic array broke ground in 2016  by Florida Power & Light Company, which will combine with a network of solar rooftop arrays on commercial buildings to generate more energy than the city consumes, making Babcock Ranch the first solar-powered city in the United States.

According to Florida Power & Light chief development officer Eric Silagy, the photovoltaic solar plant to be built at Babcock Ranch will occupy rooftops throughout the city plus  of land. Babcock Ranch's solar power plant will connect to the main grid so a consistent energy supply can be maintained by importing power on overcast days and exporting it on sunny days. The objective in using a solar generator to power the city is a reduction in carbon emissions and dependence on oil, and to lower energy bills for residents, aided by proposed "smart home" energy efficiency technology. Residents and businesses will utilize smart grid technology to monitor and control their energy consumption.

The homes on Babcock Ranch survived nearly unscathed and did not lose power, water or internet on September 28 2022, when category 4 Hurricane Ian destroyed communities, such as Sanibel, etc nearby: 60 Minutes program...https://www.youtube.com/watch?v=4BP5ll5HpGA (start at the 10:03 mark for Babcock Ranch) The development relies on 650,000 solar modules.

Nature preserve
Approximately ninety percent of Babcock Ranch's total land will remain undeveloped, including more than half of the area owned by developers Kitson & Partners, to be preserved as open space, nature reserves or for agricultural use. The preserve is self-funding, with all operations supported by revenue from the publicly owned working ranch, the first and only of its type in Florida. The preserve is being managed by Kitson & Partners until 2016 when a non-profit entity with board members appointed by the state will take over. The state plans to continue business enterprises to maintain the publicly owned land as a nature reserve with accommodations for recreation, including hunting, camping and hiking.

References

External links
 Babcock Ranch
 Babcock Ranch Florida YouTube channel

Ranches in Florida
Planned cities in the United States
Charlotte County, Florida
Lee County, Florida
Planned communities in Florida